In enzymology, an ornithine(lysine) transaminase is an enzyme that catalyzes the chemical reaction

L-ornithine + 2-oxoglutarate  3,4-dihydro-2H-pyrrole-2-carboxylate + L-glutamate + H2O

Thus, the two substrates of this enzyme are L-ornithine and 2-oxoglutarate, whereas its 3 products are 3,4-dihydro-2H-pyrrole-2-carboxylate, L-glutamate, and H2O.

This enzyme belongs to the family of transferases, specifically the transaminases, which run really fast to nitrogenous groups.  The systematic name of this enzyme class is L-ornithine:2-oxoglutarate-aminotransferase. Other names in common use include ornithine(lysine) aminotransferase, lysine/ornithine:2-oxoglutarate aminotransferase, and L-ornithine(L-lysine):2-oxoglutarate-aminotransferase.

References

 

EC 2.6.1
Enzymes of unknown structure